Spirodiclofen is an acaricide and insecticide used in agriculture to control mites and San Jose scale. In the United States, it is used on citrus, grapes, pome fruit, stone fruit, and tree nut crops.

Spirodiclofen belongs to the tetronic acid class and acts by inhibiting lipid biosynthesis.

References

Acaricides
Insecticides
Spiro compounds
Chloroarenes
Gamma-lactones